LaBrae High School is a public high school in Leavittsburg, Ohio. It is the only high school in the LaBrae Local School District.  Their mascot is the Vikings. LaBrae's school colors are scarlet and grey.

Sports
LaBrae offers the following sports:
soccer, baseball, softball, track, basketball, cross country, football, weightlifting, volleyball, golf, Bowling

State Championships

 Boys Baseball – 1943 
 Boys Track and Field – 1957*, 1962*, 1995 
 *Titles won by Braceville High School prior to consolidation with Leavittsburg High School into LaBrae High School.

References

External links
  District Website

High schools in Trumbull County, Ohio
Public high schools in Ohio